Hayhurstia is a genus of aphids in the family Aphididae. There is one described species in Hayhurstia, H. atriplicis.

References

Further reading

External links
 

Articles created by Qbugbot
Sternorrhyncha genera
Macrosiphini